Virginia's 8th House of Delegates district is one of 100 seats in the Virginia House of Delegates, the lower house of the state's bicameral legislature. District 8 consists of Roanoke, Salem, Montgomery County, and Craig County. It has been represented by Republican Joseph McNamara, and previously by Greg Habeeb from 2012 until his resignation in August 2018. In 2017, he won against Democrat Steve McBride.

District officeholders

Electoral history

References

External links
 

008
Roanoke, Virginia
Salem, Virginia
Montgomery County, Virginia
Craig County, Virginia